Naomi Jackson is an American author most known for her novel The Star Side of Bird Hill, which was nominated for the NAACP Image Award. She is a Fulbright recipient, and a graduate of the Iowa Writers' Workshop.

Her first novel, The Star Side of Bird Hill, was received positively by critics. It boasts recommendations by Entertainment Weekly, Oprah.com, The Huffington Post, Kirkus Reviews, Travel & Leisure, Bustle, Publishers Weekly, Gawker, Minnesota Public Radio, and For Harriet.

Reception 
Naomi Jackson's debut novel, The Star Side of Bird Hill, was met immediately with high praise. Highly recommended by Gawker and The Huffington Post, NPR's book review "A Lyrical Coming Of Age Tale In 'Bird Hill'" was more critical. In this piece critic Michael Schaub call "[Star Side of Bird Hill] excellent for a debut novel, though it's not entirely without its flaws." He criticizes it for its treatment of supporting characters and a plot which, he writes, "seems to get away from her towards the end." However, these flaws, "are hardly mortal sins, especially for a first-time novelist." Throughout his review, he praises the writing of the character, Phaedra, which he says makes the book worth reading.

Isabella Biedenharn with Entertainment Weekly gave it a more positive review, calling it, "so poetic in its descriptions and so alive with lovable, frustrating, painfully real characters, that your emotional response to it becomes almost physical." She goes on to praise Naomi Jackson's treatment of Dionne, Hyacinthe, and Errol, as well as Phaedra.

Honors and awards 

 Scholar-in-Residence, Schomburg Center for Research in Black Culture, Fall 2021
 Early Career Research Fellowship, Institute for the Study of Global Racial Justice, Rutgers University, 2021-2022
 Juno Grant, The Freya Project, Summer 2021
 Bronx Recognizes its Own (BRIO) Award, Bronx Council on the Arts, 2020
 Finalist, Jerome Foundation Individual Artist Fellowship, 2019 & 2020
 Notable Essay, Best American Essays 2018, selected by Hilton Als
 New York Foundation for the Arts/New York State Council on the Arts Fellowship, 2018
 Djerassi Artist Residency, Summer 2018
 MacDowell Colony Fellowship, Winter 2017 & Winter 2019
 Headlands Artist in Residence Program, Alternate, December 2016
 2017 International Dublin Literary Award (formerly IMPAC award) Long List, November 2016
 The Star Side of Bird Hill - Official Selection, City of New York's Gracie Book Club, Fall 2016
 Winner, Late Night Library Debut-litzer Prize in Fiction, August 2016
 Brooklyn Public Library Brooklyn Eagles Literary Prize in Fiction Long List, July 2016
 Hurston/Wright Legacy Award in Debut Fiction Nomination, June 2016
 Fiction Fellowship, 2016 Bread Loaf Writers’ Conference
 Honor Book for Fiction, Black Caucus of the American Library Association, January 2016
 National Book Critics Circle John Leonard Prize for First Book Long List, December 2015
 NAACP Image Award Nomination, Outstanding Literary Work – Debut Author, December 2015
 2015 Center for Fiction First Novel Prize Long List, July 2015
 Camargo Foundation Fellowship, Cassis, France, Fall 2014

Publications

Books 
 The Star Side of Bird Hill, Novel, Penguin Press, June 30, 2015 (paperback, August 30, 2016)

Stories and Articles 
 "Her Kind," Harper's (December 2021)
 “One in a Million: An Elegy for Aaliyah,” Harper's Bazaar (August 2021)
 Review of Zakiya Dalila Harris’s The Other Black Girl, Washington Post (June 2021)
 Review of Monica West’s Revival Season, Washington Post (May 2021)
 “I Wanted to Celebrate My 40th Birthday at Crop Over. COVID-19 Had Other Plans,” Harper's Bazaar (February 2021)
 Review of Ladee Hubbard’s The Rib King, Washington Post (January 2021)
 Review of Robert Jones, Jr.’s The Prophets, Washington Post (January 2021)
 “The Confounding Insistence on Innocence: A Conversation with Danielle Evans,” Poets & Writers, (Nov/Dec 2020)
 “A Litany for Survival: Giving Birth as A Black Woman in America,” Harper's (September 2020)
 Review of Ingrid Persaud’s Love After Love, Washington Post (August 2020)
 Review of Zora Neale Hurston’s Hitting a Straight Lick with a Crooked Stick, Washington Post (January 2020)
 “Joy Comes in the Morning: Finding Sanctuary in the Wake of Pulse,” Virginia Quarterly Review (June 2017)
 “Minding the Gap: On Sex & Love & the In-Between,” Tin House (#69, Fall 2016)
 “Making the Road by Walking: From Brooklyn to the Iowa Writers’ Workshop,” Poets & Writers, (Sept/Oct 2016)
 “Falling in Love with Bahia & Brazil: On Blackness, Saudade & Surrender,” Words Without Borders (July 2016)
 “To Be Young, Gifted and Black: A Travelogue of Black Women Artists in France and America,” Apogee (May 2015)
 Digital essays for BuzzFeed, Elle.com, espnW, LitHub, and New York Magazine’s The Cut (2015-2016)
 "Bumpers,” Kweli (August 2014)
 “Fever,” Caribbean Beat (July/August 2005)

References

American women writers
Caribbean-American culture
Year of birth missing (living people)
Living people
Place of birth missing (living people)
Iowa Writers' Workshop alumni
21st-century American novelists
21st-century American women writers
American women novelists